The  is a Kofun period burial mound located in the Masukawa neighborhood of the city of Fuji, Shizuoka in the Tōkai region of Japan. It was designated a National Historic Site of Japan in 1957.

Overview
The Sengen Kofun is located on a gently sloping area at the foot of Mount Ashitaka. It is a "two conjoined rectangle" type kofun (zenpō-kōhō-fun (前方後方墳)) orientated to the southeast. Its total length is 97 meters and maximum width is 60 meters, making it the largest in eastern Shizuoka Prefecture. The tumulus was surrounded by a moat with a width of 10 to 15 meters and was once covered in fukiishi, and haniwa. The tumulus is now crowned with a Shinto shrine. The tumulus has never been excavated, but is assumed from its design to date to the late 4th century.  

Per a Lidar survey conducted in 2020,  it was confirmed that the tumulus had two tiers in its posterior and a single tier in its anterior portion. rear and one step in the front. It became clear. A  flat terrace protruding from the posterior portion, which is not visible to the naked eye was also found. The survey also reconfirmed that the height of the tumulus differs significantly between its north side (mountain side) and south side (sea side), making it clear that the tumulus is made to look larger when viewed from the sea side. 

The tumulus is located approximately seven minutes on foot from the Gakunan Railway Kamiya Station.

See also
List of Historic Sites of Japan (Shizuoka)

References

External links
Fuji city home page 

Kofun
History of Shizuoka Prefecture
Fuji, Shizuoka
Historic Sites of Japan